"Express Yourself" was written by Charles Wright and performed by Charles Wright & the Watts 103rd Street Rhythm Band. It became their signature song after its release in 1970 on their album, Express Yourself. The song was produced by Wright. 

It reached #12 on the Billboard Hot 100 and was also their biggest hit on the U.S. R&B chart, reaching #3.

The single was nominated for the Grammy Award for Best R&B Performance by a Duo or Group with Vocals in 1971, losing to The Delfonics song "Didn't I (Blow Your Mind This Time)" and ranked #57 on Billboard's Year-End Hot 100 singles of 1970.

Chart performance

Covers and samples
Idris Muhammad on his 1971 album, Black Rhythm Revolution!
N.W.A sampled it in their 1989 song also titled "Express Yourself".  It reached #40 on the U.S. R&B chart and #50 on the UK Singles Chart. and was featured on their 1988 album, Straight Outta Compton.
Kurtis Blow on his 1988 album, Back by Popular Demand.
Saccharine Trust on their 1989 album, Past Lives.
Roger and Fu-Schnickens on the 1993 soundtrack album Addams Family Values: Music from the Motion Picture.
The House Jacks, for Tommy Boy Records, on their 1997 album, Funkwich.
Francis Rocco Prestia on his 1999 album, ...Everybody on the Bus with vocals by Tamara Champlin.
Snooks Eaglin on his 2002 album The Way It Is with Jon Cleary.
Jason Mraz in Cheaper by the Dozen 2.
Tinchy Stryder sampled it on his 2009 album, Catch 22 on the song "Express Urself".
Labrinth sampled it on the track "Express Yourself" from his 2012 album Electronic Earth.  The song reached #12 on the UK Singles Chart.

In popular culture
Fu-Schnickens - over the end credits of the 1993 film Addams Family Values.
The 2000 film Remember the Titans.
Remix by Mocean Worker - during the end credits of the 2005 film Guess Who.
During the fight scene in the 2005 film Mr. & Mrs. Smith.
Labrinth, in a 2012 commercial for Windows 8.
Teaser trailer for the 2017 film The Emoji Movie.
Cheaper By the Dozen (2005)

References

External links
 

1970 songs
1971 singles
Charles Wright & the Watts 103rd Street Rhythm Band songs
Warner Records singles